Oberbeck is a surname. Notable people with the surname include:

 Anton Oberbeck (1846–1900), German physicist
 Henry Oberbeck (1858–1921), baseball outfielder, third baseman, pitcher and Umpire
 Susanne Oberbeck, electronic musician
 Willi Oberbeck (1910–1979), German professional road bicycle racer